The Hochkönig Road ( or, in Tyrol, Hochkönigstraße), – the B 164 – is a state road (Landesstraße) in Austria. Beginning in Bischofshofen in the Salzach valley, it runs initially between the Hochkönig and Dienten Mountains along the Dienten Saddle and on into the valley of the  Saalach to Saalfelden am Steinernen Meer. On the far side of the Saalach the road runs into the Leoganger Tal between the Leoganger Steinberge and the Loferer Steinberge to the north and the Kitzbühel Alps to the south via Leogang up to the Grießen Pass, and via Fieberbrunn downhill again into the valley of the Kitzbühler Ache to St. Johann in Tirol. On the last section the road runs parallel to the Salzburg-Tyrol Railway.

History 

Since 1948 three sections of the present-day Hochkönig Road in the state of Salzburg have been classified as Class II state highways ( Landesstraßen):
The  Mühlbach Road (Mühlbacher Straße) between Bischofshofen and Mühlbach
The  Alm Road (Almer Straße) between Alm and Saalfelden

With effect from 1 July 1962 the last two roads were extended:

The middle section between Mühlbach and Hinterthal wurde was declared a Konkurrenzstraße (literally "competitive road") by the state act of 11 April 1962. In Austrian legal language Konkurrenz means joint financing of a project by various institutions, of which each takes on a legally defined percentage of the maintenance costs. In this case the shares were:
the State of Salzburg 65.00%
the municipality of Alm 8.00%
the municipality of Bischofshofen 2.25%
the municipality of Dienten am Hochkönig 8.00%
the municipality of Mühlbach am Hochkönig 8.00%
the municipality of Saalfelden 3.75%
the Austrian State Forests 5.00 %

The Hochkönig Road has been part of the network of federal highways (Bundestrassen) in Austria since 1 Jan 1973.

Traffic restrictions 
The following restrictions apply to the Hochkönig Road:
no entry on the B 164 Hochkönigstraße from km 56.251 (Hochfilzen municipality) to km 75.76 (St. Johann in Tirol) in both directions for lorries over  maximum permitted weight, excluding recovery and breakdown vehicles, military vehicles and lorries that load or unload, start or finish their journeys in the following municipalities: St. Johann in Tirol and Fieberbrunn in Tyrol, Hochfilzen and Leogang in the state of Salzburg.

Route / Junctions

References 

Kitzbühel District
Berchtesgaden Alps
Kitzbühel Alps
Loferer and Leoganger Steinberge
Salzburg Slate Alps